This is a list of medalists from the ICF Canoe Sprint World Championships in men's kayak.

K-1 200 m
Debuted: 1994.

K-1 500 m
Debuted: 1948.

K-1 1000 m
Debuted: 1938. Not held: 1948. Resumed: 1950.

K-1 5000 m
Debuted: 2010

K-1 10000 m
Debuted: 1938. Not held: 1948. Resumed: 1950. Discontinued: 1993. Folding appeared only in 1938.

K-2 200 m
Debuted: 1994.

K-2 500 m
Debuted: 1948.

K-2 1000 m
Debuted: 1938. Not held: 1948. Resumed: 1950.

K-2 10000 m
Debuted: 1938. Not held: 1948. Resumed: 1950. Discontinued: 1993. Folding kayak only appeared in 1938.

K-4 200 m
Debuted: 1994. Discontinued: 2009.

K-4 500 m
Debuted: 1977. Discontinued: 2007. Resumed: 2017.

K-4 1000 m
Debuted: 1938. This is one of only two events held at every championships.

K-4 10000 m
Debuted: 1950. Discontinued: 1993.

Relay K-1 4 × 200 m
Debuted: 2009. Discontinued in 2014.

Relay K-1 4 x 500 m
Debuted: 1948. Discontinued: 1975.

Mix K-2 200 m
Debuted: 2021

Medal reallocation

References

 
 
 

ICF Canoe Sprint World Championships men's kayak